Championship League is a professional snooker tournament, devised by Matchroom Sport. A ranking event version of the tournament began from September 2020, played similarly to its invitational, non-ranking counterpart but with some minor changes and opened to the entire World Snooker Tour. The tournament was originally held at the Crondon Park Golf Club in Stock, Essex, from its debut in 2008 until 2016. From 2017 to 2018, it was held at the Ricoh Arena in Coventry. Luca Brecel is the reigning champion of the ranking edition and John Higgins is the reigning champion of the invitational edition.

History and format 
The event was introduced in 2008 by Barry Hearn to provide additional competition and a qualifier to the Premier League Snooker. 25 professionals take part, there is no audience. Players earn money for every frame won and there are also prizes for being a semi-finalist, runner-up and winner of each group, with more money involved in the winners group.

In the first two years all matches in the group stages were the best of four, meaning that the matches could end in a draw as all the four frames were played, and the semi-finals and final was best of five. From 2010 all matches are best of five.

The competition runs over eight groups, each consisting of seven players. From the league stage of the first seven groups the top four qualify for a play-off, the winner of which qualifies for the Winners' Group. The bottom two players of each league are eliminated and the remaining four move to the next group, where they are joined by three more players until the seventh group. The winners play in the final group with the overall winner taking a place in that year's Premier League Snooker until 2012, and in that year's Champion of Champions from 2013.

There have been eight maximum breaks in the history of the tournament. Shaun Murphy compiled the first at the 2014 event against Mark Davis in their league stage match of group two. Barry Hawkins achieved the second one-year later at the 2015 event against Stephen Maguire in their league stage match of group one. David Gilbert achieved the third one at the 2015 event against Xiao Guodong in their league stage match of group seven. In 2016 Fergal O'Brien made the fourth maximum break during his league stage match against Mark Davis in group six. Mark Davis produced the fifth in the competition's history in the 2017 event in the deciding frame of the Group Three playoff final against Neil Robertson. Later on, Davis made another maximum break in the deciding 5th frame of his Winners' Group round robin match against John Higgins, becoming the first player to make two maximum breaks in a tournament. In the 2018 edition, Luca Brecel made the seventh maximum in the competition's history during his match against John Higgins, it being the first maximum of his career. In the 2019 Championship League David Gilbert made the historic 147th maximum break in his group 5 round robin match against Stephen Maguire. It was Gilbert's second professional maximum break (he achieved his first in the 2015 Championship League), and it was the sixth consecutive year that a maximum was made in the Championship League.

Winners

References

External links
 

 
Snooker competitions in England
Snooker ranking tournaments
Snooker non-ranking competitions
Recurring sporting events established in 2008
2008 establishments in England